Mikhail Vladimirovich Plotkin (20 April 1944 – 1 May 2021) was a Russian music producer and administrator (Vesyolye Rebyata, Samotsvety, Boris Amarantov, Leysya, Pesnya, Alla Pugacheva).

He died of complications from COVID-19 in Moscow at age 77 during the COVID-19 pandemic in Russia.

References

External links
 
 

1944 births
2021 deaths
Russian record producers
Musicians from Moscow
Deaths from the COVID-19 pandemic in Russia
Russian Academy of Theatre Arts alumni